Great Britain II (also United Friendly, Norsk Data GB, With Integrity, Whitbread Heritage) is a Maxi racing yacht launched by Princess Anne on 21 May 1973 named after the , built by Isambard Kingdom Brunel which was the world's first "iron clad" steam ship and whose salvage from the Falklands was underwritten by Sir Jack Hayward, who also funded the building of GB II.

Background
She was designed to take part in the first "Whitbread Round the World Race", designed by Alan Gurney, and built for Chay Blyth and a group of paratroopers, who went on to be the crew for the race.

The 77 ft sloop is constructed of fibreglass and foam sandwich to give the lightest possible displacement.

Designed to be the fastest yacht in the world and finished in second place on handicap after the Mexican Swan 65 named Sayula II – the first Whitbread Round the World Race winner in 1973. 

Great Britain II has taken part in all six Whitbread Round the World Races. Racing in the first five and "following" (not a registered participant) in the last, "transitional" Whitbread in 1993–94 under the name With Integrity, sailing with a short handed crew. The following year the race became known as the Volvo Ocean Race.

The boat is currently named the Whitbread Heritage and has been in private ownership since 1996.

References

Individual sailing vessels
1970s sailing yachts
Volvo Ocean Race yachts
Sailing yachts built in the United Kingdom
Sailing yachts of the United Kingdom
Sailboat type designs by Alan Gurney